Terrence Harold White (born March 31, 1943) is a Canadian academic. He served as president of the University of Calgary from 1996 to 2001. From 1988 to 1996, he was president and vice-chancellor of Brock University, and prior to that the Dean of the Faculty of Arts at the University of Alberta. He is an alumnus of the University of Wisconsin–Oshkosh, Michigan State University, and University of Toronto.

References

1961 births
Living people
Michigan State University alumni
People from Ottawa
University of Toronto alumni
University of Wisconsin–Oshkosh alumni